Seetharama Raju is a 1999 Indian Telugu-language action drama film, produced jointly by Nagarjuna Akkineni, D. Sivaprasad Reddy under the Great India Enterprises & Kamakshi Movies banner and directed by Y. V. S. Chowdary. It stars Nandamuri Harikrishna, Nagarjuna Akkineni, Sakshi Shivanand, Sanghavi  and music composed by M. M. Keeravani. For the first time, Nagarjuna has crooned a song with his own voice in this film.

The film won two state Nandi Awards. The film was dubbed into Tamil as Sathriya Dharmam.

Plot 

The families of Seetayya and Basavaraju are at loggerheads with each other. When Seetayya gets killed, Ramaraju decides to seek revenge for his death.

Cast

Soundtrack

The music was composed by M. M. Keeravani. Lyrics were written by Sirivennela Sitarama Sastry. Music was released on ADITYA Music Company.

Awards 
Nandi Awards-1999
 Best Character Actress - Nirmalamma 
 Best Makeup Artist - Ramachandra Rao

References

External links
 

1999 films
1990s Telugu-language films
1990s masala films
Films scored by M. M. Keeravani
Films about feuds
Indian action drama films
Films directed by Y. V. S. Chowdary
1990s action drama films